Golchin may refer to:
 Golchin, Zanjan